Piotrów may refer to the following places:
Piotrów, Piotrków County in Łódź Voivodeship (central Poland)
Piotrów, Poddębice County in Łódź Voivodeship (central Poland)
Piotrów, Kielce County in Świętokrzyskie Voivodeship (south-central Poland)
Piotrów, Ostrowiec County in Świętokrzyskie Voivodeship (south-central Poland)
Piotrów, Białobrzegi County in Masovian Voivodeship (east-central Poland)
Piotrów, Sochaczew County in Masovian Voivodeship (east-central Poland)
Piotrów, Greater Poland Voivodeship (west-central Poland)
Piotrów, Lubusz Voivodeship (west Poland)